Joe Becker may refer to:

Joe Becker (baseball) (1908–1998), catcher in Major League Baseball
Joe Becker (cyclist) (1931–2014), American Olympic cyclist
Joe Becker (musician) (born 1976), American guitarist, composer and multi-instrumentalist
Joe Becker (Unicode), co-founder of the Unicode Consortium
Jozef Becker, drummer for Thin White Rope, True West, Game Theory, and The Loud Family